Ashleigh Adele Ball (born March 31, 1983) is a Canadian voice actress and musician, known for performing with the rock band Hey Ocean!, as well as voicing characters in several toyetic movies and television series, notably the Barbie film series, Bratz, Johnny Test, Littlest Pet Shop, and My Little Pony: Friendship Is Magic. She is the subject of the documentary A Brony Tale directed by Brent Hodge, which follows her through her first interactions with the brony community at BronyCon 2012.

Early life
Ball was born in Vancouver, British Columbia on March 31, 1983.

Career
Ball has found a fan following through her band Hey Ocean! and through bronies, the adult fans of the television show My Little Pony: Friendship Is Magic, a show in which she voices and sings as two of the six main characters, Applejack and Rainbow Dash. Ball has been to several My Little Pony fan conventions, including BronyCon and Everfree Northwest as a guest of honor. Ball stated in her documentary A Brony Tale, in which she is the main subject, "It's (My Little Pony) a really important part of a lot of these people's lives. So yeah, as long as My Little Ponies exist, there will be bronies."

On May 2, 2017, she released the music video "Crazy" and on June 2, released her debut solo EP Gold in You.

Discography

Solo albums
 Gold in You (EP) (2017)

Filmography

Anime

Animation

Films

Video games

Live-action

References

Bibliography

External links
  
 
 

1983 births
Living people
Actresses from Vancouver
Canadian film actresses
Canadian video game actresses
Canadian voice actresses
Musicians from Vancouver
Canadian indie pop musicians
21st-century Canadian actresses
21st-century Canadian women singers